Henri Cohen (born 8 June 1947) is a number theorist, and a professor at the University of Bordeaux.  He is best known for leading the team that created the PARI/GP computer algebra system.  He introduced the Rankin–Cohen bracket and has written several textbooks in computational and algebraic number theory.

Selected publications 
 ; 2nd correct. print 1995; 1st printing 1993

References

External links 
 Personal web page

Number theorists
École Normale Supérieure alumni
20th-century French mathematicians
21st-century French mathematicians
1947 births
Living people
Academic staff of the University of Bordeaux